Jace Richdale is an American producer and writer. He served as co-executive producer for seasons 5 and 6 of The Simpsons and wrote the season five episode "Burns' Heir". He was a part of the Simpsons writing staff during seasons 5, 6, 9 and 10. Other writing credits include Dexter, Family Ties, Get a Life, and The Oblongs. He has also produced episodes of The Oblongs, Oliver Beene, and the movie Wiener Park.

He was married to fellow writer Jennifer Crittenden for three years; they separated in 1998.  He is now married to Allegra Growdon.

In 2012, Richdale was nominated for the Writers Guild of America Award for Best Screenplay – Episodic Drama for his writing for the episode "Just Let Go" for the sixth season of Dexter.

References

External links

American television writers
American male television writers
American television producers
Year of birth missing (living people)
Living people